Haminados, also known as chaminados, or braised eggs, is a traditional Sephardi Jewish dish, popular in Israel, and commonly served as an ingredient or accompaniment to a number of dishes. Haminados are an important element of Israeli cuisine, and are commonly prepared on their own or as part of the Sephardi and Mizrahi Jewish Shabbat stew chamin.

Overview

Haminados typically consists of whole eggs in the shell, which are placed on top of a hamin (a Shabbat stew) in the stewing pot. The eggs are braised over many hours, often overnight and turn brown in the course of all-night cooking. The brown eggs, called haminados (güevos haminadavos in Ladino, huevos haminados in Spanish), are shelled before serving and placed on top of the other cooked ingredients. In the Tunisian version, the brown eggs are cooked separately in a metal pot on the all-night stove with water and tea leaves (similar to tea eggs). Haminados can be cooked in this way even if no hamin is prepared. The addition of tea leaves, coffee grinds, or onion skins to the water dyes the shell purple and the white a light brown, giving the egg a smooth creamy texture. In Israel, brown eggs are a popular accompaniment to ful medames (a dish of mashed broad beans) and they may also be served with hummus (a dip of mashed chickpeas mixed with tahini) and in a sabich sandwich.

See also

Hardboiled egg
Hamin
Poached egg
Sabich

References

Sephardi Jewish cuisine
Israeli cuisine
Shabbat food
Egg dishes